"Just as Much as Ever" is a song written by Charles Singleton and Larry Coleman. The song was a hit single for Bob Beckham, Nat King Cole, and Bobby Vinton.

Bob Beckham version
Bob Beckham released a version of "Just as Much as Ever" in 1959 as a single and on his album Just as Much as Ever. Beckham's version spent 21 weeks on the Billboard Hot 100 chart, peaking at No. 32, while reaching No. 41 on the Cash Box Top 100, No. 32 on the Cash Box chart of "The Records Disc Jockeys Played Most", and No. 19 on Canada's CHUM Hit Parade.

Nat King Cole version
In 1960, Nat King Cole released a version of "Just as Much as Ever" as a single in the United Kingdom. Cole's version spent 10 weeks on the UK's Record Retailer chart, reaching No. 18, reaching No. 18 on the UK's New Musical Express chart as well.

Bobby Vinton version

In 1967, Bobby Vinton released a version of "Just as Much as Ever" as a single and on the album Please Love Me Forever. Vinton's version spent 8 weeks on the Billboard Hot 100 chart, peaking at No. 24, while reaching No. 10 on Billboards Easy Listening chart, No. 14 on the Cash Box Top 100, No. 13 on Record Worlds "100 Top Pops", No. 6 on Record Worlds "Top Non-Rock" chart, No. 3 on Record Worlds "Juke Box Top 25", and No. 11 on Canada's RPM 100.

References

1959 songs
1959 singles
1960 singles
1967 singles
Bobby Vinton songs
Nat King Cole songs
Songs written by Charles Singleton (songwriter)
Songs with music by Larry Coleman
Capitol Records singles
Decca Records singles
Epic Records singles
Song recordings produced by Billy Sherrill